Nizhniye Karshli (Dargwa: УбяхI Хъаршли) is a rural locality (a selo) in Kassagumakhinsky Selsoviet, Akushinsky District, Republic of Dagestan, Russia. The population was 81 as of 2010.

Geography 
It is located 29 km south of Akusha, on the Khunikotta River.

References 

Rural localities in Akushinsky District